Claudia Andrea Nogueira Fernández (26 November 1969 Santiago) is a Chilean lawyer and politician. She is a member of the Independent Democratic Union party, since 1987; in December 2005 she was elected Deputy of the Republic of Chile by District No. 19, corresponding to the communes of Independencia and Recoleta, in the Metropolitan Region, a position she held until 2018. She is married with Gonzalo Cornejo (Former Mayor of Recoleta).

Life 
She completed her basic studies at the Craighouse School in Santiago de Chile, and at the La Salle School in Temuco, where she completed her basic and media studies. Later she returned to Santiago, where she graduated as an attorney, after studying law at the Gabriela Mistral University.

Nogueira joined the Independent Democratic Union party at the age of eighteen, being a founding member, and university leader of her party.
She dedicated herself to give classes of Introduction to Law in the careers of Journalism and Auditing of the 
Andrés Bello National University.   She worked in  social work for her party. In 1997 she was Jovino Novoa's chief of staff in the senatorial campaign. She provided legal assistance at the parliamentary headquarters of the  Deputy Cristian Leay, giving motivational talks to young people from Recoleta and Independencia. For the 1999 presidential campaign of Joaquín Lavín, she managed the women's issues of the candidate.

Her work continued as the wife of the Mayor of Recoleta, Gonzalo Cornejo, this is how she created a Training Center in various areas such as: gastronomy, hairdressing, dressmaking, first aid, computers, etc. Specially designed for female heads of household so that they could integrate into the labor market or work from their homes taking care of their children, 300 women are trained per year. She created several crafts and gymnastics workshops in more than 230 Mother and Senior Adult Centers for recreational and training purposes. She actively participated in the support of the Kindergartens of the Recoleta district, devising a kind of sponsorship between companies and the latter, collaborating permanently in accommodating your needs.

In 2005 she was nominated as Deputy for the District No. 19 corresponding to the communes of Independencia and Recoleta, in the Metropolitan Region for the period 2006–2010, being elected in December 2005 and assumed her functions on March 11, 2006 .

Electoral history

2005 parliamentary elections 

 Parliamentary Elections of 2005 to Deputy for District 19 (Independencia and Recoleta)

2009 Parliamentary elections 

 Parliamentary Elections of 2009 to Deputy for District 19 (Independencia and Recoleta)

2013 Parliamentary elections 

 Parliamentary elections of 2013 to Deputy for district 19 (Independence and Recoleta)

2017 Parliamentary elections 

 Parliamentary elections of 2017 to Deputy for the 9th district (Navia Hill, Conchalí, Huechuraba, Independence, Lo Prado, Quinta Normal, Recoleta and Renca)

References

External links 

 Claudia Nogueira Fernández Reseñas Biográficas, www.bcn.cl

Chilean women lawyers
1969 births
Independent Democratic Union politicians
People from Santiago
Living people
20th-century Chilean lawyers
21st-century Chilean lawyers
20th-century women lawyers
21st-century women lawyers